Christmas Worship, Vol. 2 is the second Christmas album from Paul Baloche. Integrity Music released the album on October 2, 2015. The album is a follow-up to Christmas Worship (2013).

Critical reception

Tony Cummings, indicating in a ten out of ten review by Cross Rhythms, describes, "Baloche should be congratulated in creating, what is to my ears, the best Christmas song of the year." Awarding the album three stars for CCM Magazine, Matt Conner states, "Christmas Worship, Vol. 2 is an ideal package that puts a fresh spin on well known holiday tunes." Caitlin Lassiter, giving the album four stars from New Release Today, writes, "Paul created something truly refreshing and different with Christmas Worship II." Giving the album four and a half stars at 365 Days of Inspiring Media, Joshua Andre says, "Paul to show us both of these variants of Christmas music, is a treat!". Carolyn Aldis, allotting the album four and a half stars by Louder Than the Music, responds, "Paul has chosen some great artists to work on this album with him and the end product is a gift."

Chart performance
The album placed at No. 6 on the Billboard magazine Holiday Albums chart.

Track listing

Personnel

Musicians 
 Paul Baloche – lead vocals, acoustic guitar, arrangements 
 Michael Rossback – acoustic piano, guitars, bass, horns, arrangements
 Ari Heinikainen – Wurlitzer electric piano, organ
 Ben Gowell – guitars 
 Scotty Murray – guitars 
 Carl Albrecht – drums, percussion 
 Jared Henderson – drums, percussion
 David Baloche – French horn, backing vocals, vocals (10)
 Rita Baloche – backing vocals, vocals (10), vocal arrangements 
 Bri Giles – backing vocals
 Gina Milne – backing vocals, vocals (6)
 All Sons & Daughters – vocals (1)
 Kathryn Scott – vocals (4)
 Phil Wickham – vocals (5)
 Onajé Jefferson – vocals (7)
 Graham Kendrick – vocals (8)
 Lenny LeBlanc – vocals (9)
 Madison Cunningham – vocals (12)

Production 
 C. Ryan Dunham – executive producer
 Michael Rossback – producer, engineer, mixing
 Paul Baloche – co-producer 
 Rita Baloche – vocal producer 
 Tom Brooks – engineer 
 Jeoff Harris – engineer, editing, transcriptions
 Andrew Mendelson – mastering at Georgetown Masters (Nashville, Tennessee)
 Becca Nicolson – production coordinator
 Thom Hoyman – creative director, design

References

2015 Christmas albums
Christmas albums by American artists
Paul Baloche albums
Sequel albums